Miss Amazonas is a Brazilian Beauty pageant which selects the representative for the State of Amazonas at the Miss Brazil contest. The pageant was created in 1955 and has been held every year since with the exception of 1990, 1991, 1993, and 2020. It is also the first and the oldest pageant in the state. The pageant is held annually with representation of several municipalities. The competition was organized for many years by the ceremonial Lucius Gonçalves (from 2010 to 2018) as a director, but in 2019, it was TV Bandeirantes Amazonas who carried out the contest. Since 2021, Miro Sampaio has been the State Director. Amazonas is the only state in the Northern Region of Brazil to have two crowns in the national contest:

Terezinha Morango (born in São Paulo de Olivença) in 1957
Mayra Dias, from Itacoatiar, in 2018.

Gallery of Titleholders

Results Summary

Placements
Miss Brazil:  (1957); Mayra Dias (2018)
1st Runner-Up: Annete Stone (1955); Adriana Lippolis Barcellos (1981); Lilian Lopes (2010); Rebeca Portilho (2022)
2nd Runner-Up: 
3rd Runner-Up: 
4th Runner-Up: Priscilla Meirelles (2004); Tammy Cavalcante (2011); Rebeca Portilho (2021)
Top 5/Top 8: Vanja Nobre Jacob (1960); Fátima Neves da Silva (1963); Suely de Mello Veras (1969); Terezinha de Jesus Barbosa (1971)
Top 10/Top 12: Luisiana Medeiros (1989); Ana Cristina Pereira (1992); Cristiane Silva Lins (1994); Jacilene Cardoso Nunes (1996); Liana Paula Martins (1997); Tatiane Alves (2002); Danielle Costa (2005); Vivian Amorim (2012); Ytala Narjjara (2014); Lorena Alencar (2019)
Top 15/Top 16:  (2007); Brena Dianná (2016); Juliana Soares (2017)

Special Awards
Best State Costume: Vivian Amorim (2012)
Miss Congeniality: Telma Carvalho (1964)
Miss Popular Vote: Brena Dianná (2016); Juliana Soares (2017); Mayra Dias (2018)
Photography Challenge: Mayra Dias (2018)

Titleholders

Table Notes

References

External links
Official Miss Brasil Website

Women in Brazil
Amazonas
Miss Brazil state pageants